Greater Jasper Consolidated Schools is a school district in Dubois County, Indiana. Its district covers the Central and Northwest parts of the county. Its superintendent is Dr. Tracy Lorey. 

On April 19, 2017, it was announced that Greater Jasper Consolidated Schools proposed to consolidate Fifth Street Elementary and Tenth Street Elementary into a single building. On the night of June 26, 2017, the school board voted unanimously for the project to be green-lit. On March 4, 2020, GJCS announced that construction would wrap up in April, and students would move in for the 2020-2021 school year in August.

As of the 2019-2020 school year, there are 3,203 students. In the 2016-17 school year, there were 218 teachers.

Greater Jasper Consolidated Schools serves the communities of Jasper, Ireland, Portersville, Maltersville, among others.

Schools

High school
Jasper High School

Middle school
Jasper Middle School

Elementary schools
Fifth Street Elementary School (PK-2)
Ireland Elementary School (PK-5)
Tenth Street School (3-5)

Exceptional children's school
Exceptional Children's Cooperative

References

External links

School districts in Indiana
Education in Dubois County, Indiana